The Kentish Note Book was a 19th-century magazine about the English county Kent.

It had  two issues per year. The magazine had notes, queries and replies on subjects connected to Kent.

An example of a note featured in the note books is given in a May 2000 issue of the New Scientist magazine, in relationship to the suspected psychological effect of nominative determinism, the hypothesis that people gravitate towards areas of work that fit their name. In the Feedback column it refers to a “Note” addressed to the editor of the Kentish Note Book, dated 29 December 1888 and entitled “What’s in a name?”.

"In many cases the name admirably agrees with the occupation or calling of the individual who bears it." The note then goes on to cite examples culled from the Shooters Hill district in the county of Kent: "There are several carriers by the name of Carter; a hosier named Hosegood; an auctioneer named Sales; and a draper named Cuff . . ."

References

Bibliography
 The Kentish Note Book: A half-yearly magazine of notes, queries, and replies on subjects connected with the County of Kent. Volume I (November, 1888 – December, 1890). [Reprinted with additions and corrections from The Gravesend and Dartford Reporter.] Paperback – 1891 by George O. Howell
 The Kentish Notebook: A Collection of Notes, Queries, and Replies on Subjects Connected with the County of Kent Volume II Hardcover – 1894 by George O. Howell. Publisher: Henry Gray

Defunct magazines published in the United Kingdom
History of Kent